The 1892 Manitoba general election was held on July 23, 1892.

References 

1892 elections in Canada
1892
1892 in Manitoba
July 1892 events